Cube Vision (sometimes stylized as CubeVision or Cubevision) is an American film and television production company founded by Ice Cube and Matt Alvarez.

History
Ice Cube started his movie producing career in 1995 with his then manager Patricia Charbonet. Together, they produced Friday (1995), Dangerous Ground (1997) and The Players Club (1998). Cube, along with new producing partner Matt Alvarez, founded CubeVision (later credited in films as Cube Vision) in 1998. The company's first film would be the 2000s Next Friday, a sequel to Ice Cube's 1995 film Friday. Cube Vision went on to produce All About The Benjamins, Barbershop and Friday After Next, the third film in the Friday film series, in 2002.

In February 2003, Ice Cube signed a deal to star and produce three pictures with Revolution Studios. In an interview, Cube said of the deal, "I believe that a lot of good things are going to happen out of this relationship for both (Revolution and Cube Vision)."
The films to come from the Revolution Studios partnership would be April 2005's XXX: State of the Union, which Cube only starred in, and Are We There Yet? in January 2005 and Are We Done Yet? in April 2007, which Cube starred in and produced for Cube Vision.

In 2016, CubeVision signed a deal with 20th Century Fox, covering development of shows for all outlets, and giving access to Cube's music library.

Filmography

Films

1990s

2000s

2010s

Upcoming

Television

2000s

2010s

Television movies

References

External links
 Official YouTube channel
 Cube Vision at the Internet Movie Database

Film production companies of the United States
Television production companies of the United States
Ice Cube